Palladium(II) fluoride, also known as palladium difluoride, is the chemical compound of palladium and fluorine with the formula PdF2.

Synthesis
PdF2 is prepared by refluxing palladium(II,IV) fluoride, PdII[PdIVF6], with selenium tetrafluoride, SeF4.

Pd[PdF6] + SeF4 → 2PdF2 + SeF6

Structure and paramagnetism
Like its lighter congener nickel(II) fluoride, PdF2 adopts a rutile-type crystal structure, containing octahedrally coordinated palladium, which has the electronic configuration t e. This configuration causes PdF2 to be paramagnetic due to two unpaired electrons, one in each eg-symmetry orbital of palladium.

Applications
Palladium fluoride is an insoluble powder used in infrared optical sensors, and in situations where reactivity to oxygen makes palladium oxide unsuitable.

See also
 Palladium fluoride

References

Palladium compounds
Fluorides
Platinum group halides